Mariana De Jesús Lagos (born 29 August 1992) is a Chilean field hockey player.

Lagos made her senior international debut for Chile in 2013. In the same year, she won silver with the team at the 2013 South American Championships in Santiago, Chile. 

Since making her debut in 2013, Lagos has remained a regular inclusion in the women's side, most recently representing Chile in a 2018 test series against the United States.

In September 2018, Lagos was named in the SA Suns team to represent South Australia at the 2018 Australian Hockey League.

References

1992 births
Living people
Chilean female field hockey players
Competitors at the 2022 South American Games
South American Games gold medalists for Chile
South American Games medalists in field hockey
20th-century Chilean women
21st-century Chilean women